The 2001 Oran Park V8 Supercar round was the eighth round of the 2001 Shell Championship Series. It was held on the weekend of 28 to 29 July at the Oran Park Raceway in Narellan, New South Wales.

Race report 

Craig Lowndes achieved pole position in the top-ten shootout, which was his first driving a Ford and the first pole position of the year for the Gibson Motor Sport team. Mark Skaife won both races, taking maximum points whilst doing so. David Besnard achieved his best result of the season of second overall and Lowndes achieved third even after being turned around in race three by Garth Tander.

Race results

Qualifying

Top Ten Shootout

Race 1

Race 2 

Notes
 – Garth Tander was given a 32-second penalty after he was deemed to have gained an advantage by spinning Craig Lowndes on the final lap.

Championship Standings

References

Oran Park